According to Islamic tradition, Ad (also rendered Aad), who came from the northeast and was the progenitor of the Adites, was the son of Uz (عوض), who was the son of Aram (إرم), who was the son of Shem, the son of Noah (سام بن نوح). Therefore, Noah (نوح) is said to be Ad's great-great-grandfather.

In Islamic tradition, the Adites are believed to be among the first inhabitants of Arabia. They belong to what is known as the Extinct Arabs (العرب البائدة).

After Ad's death, his sons Shadid and Shedad reigned in succession over the Adites. ʿĀd then became a collective term for all those descended from Ad.

According to the Quran, Iram (إرم) is the place to which the prophet Hud (هود) was sent in order to guide its people back to the righteous path of God. The citizens continued in their polytheistic ways and Allah destroyed their city in a great storm.

Quran 89:6-14 mentions ʿĀd:It is said that Hud along with his closest family escaped the region and resettled in and around the modern area of Hadramaut in Yemen. His grave is traditionally said to be located there till this day. According to Islamic scholarship, the descendants of Hud were the forerunners to the Pure Arabs (العرب العاربة).

See also
 ʿĀd, ancient Arab tribe

References

External links
 
 

Noah
Iram of the Pillars